Baazigar is a 1993 Indian Hindi-language romantic thriller film directed by Abbas–Mustan and produced by Venus Movies. It stars Shah Rukh Khan and Kajol in lead roles, while Raakhee, Shilpa Shetty, Dalip Tahil, Siddharth Ray, and Johnny Lever appear in supporting roles, with the soundtrack composed by Anu Malik. The film is about a young man seeking to avenge the fall of his family. The story is loosely based on Ira Levin's 1953 novel A Kiss Before Dying and its 1991 film adaptation of the same name.

This was Khan's breakthrough role as the sole lead (his first as an anti-hero), along with being his eighth film out of eighty throughout his 30-year career, Kajol's first commercial success and Shetty's film debut.

Baazigar was released on 12 November 1993, coinciding with the festival of Diwali. Made on a budget of 40 million, the film was declared a success at the box office with a worldwide gross of 320 million. Apart from emerging as a major financial success, the film has become a cult film over years due to its suspense, story, screenplay, soundtrack and performances of the cast. It was the first collaboration between Khan and Kajol, who went on to become one of India's most iconic on-screen couples. It helped establish Khan, Kajol, Shetty and Malik in Hindi films, and the soundtrack sold over 10million units, thus becoming the highest-selling album of the year.

At the 39th Filmfare Awards, Baazigar received 10 nominations, including Best Film, Best Supporting Actress and Best Female Debut (both for Shetty), and won 4 awards, including Best Actor (Khan) and Best Music Director (Malik).

A Telugu remake, Vetagadu, was released in 1995, before a Tamil remake, Samrat, was released in 1997 and a Kannada remake, Nagarahavu, was released in 2002.

Plot

Ajay Sharma is a young boy who grows up to seek revenge for his father's death caused by Madan Chopra, a rich businessman. Chopra has two daughters: Seema and Priya. Ajay begins a secret relationship with Seema. Chopra takes part in his last car race in Madras, only to learn that another participant, Vicky Malhotra, who Ajay assumes the role as, let him win on purpose to meet him. Chopra is impressed with 'Vicky', and Priya falls in love with him. This way, Ajay manages to date both Seema and Priya using different identities.

Later, Ajay convinces Seema to commit suicide with him, when her father arranges her marriage with someone else. They write and sign suicide notes, but he then lies that he was simply testing her and rips up his note while keeping hers. They make plans to get married at the registrar's office the next day. However, while waiting for the office to open, Ajay takes Seema to the roof of the building and pushes her off, murdering her. He then discreetly mails her suicide note to her house. Chopra hastily orders the case closed to prevent further embarrassment should the suicide note be discovered. Suspecting that her sister didn't commit suicide, Priya secretly continues the investigation with the help of police inspector Karan Saxena, an old friend from college.

Ravi, a college friend of Seema who had a crush on her, tells Priya that he has a photo of Seema and Ajay together at a birthday party back at his hostel. Before Priya can reach Ravi to see the photo, Ajay finds out about this and murders Ravi. In their struggle, Ajay forces him to sign a suicide note, which makes it appear as though Ravi is Seema's murderer. Thus, the investigation is halted a second time. Meanwhile, Ajay, posing as 'Vicky', slowly wins Chopra's confidence. Chopra decides to get 'Vicky' and Priya engaged.

It is revealed through a flashback that Chopra had been a project manager in the company run by Ajay's late father Mr. Sharma, but when Sharma discovered that he was embezzling money, he had Chopra imprisoned for three years. After Madan completed his jail term, he asked for forgiveness, and Sharma's wife persuaded her husband to re-employ him. However, unbeknownst to anyone, Chopra had returned to exact revenge. One day, Sharma had to go on a business trip, so he handed the power of attorney to Chopra, who used the opportunity to become the company's owner. Sharma learned of this after returning, but it was too late. His family was ejected from their palatial home after Chopra took a loan on Sharma's name. Ajay witnessed Chopra eve-teasing his mother when she came to ask for their home back, and she subsequently cursed him to tragedy and helplessness later on in life. Heartbroken, Ajay vowed to make Chopra pay.

Back in the present, Seema's friend Anjali meets Priya and Ajay at a jewellery shop. She also discovers a photo of Seema and Ajay at her birthday party. 'Vicky' and Priya get engaged that evening. Anjali phones the Chopra residence during Ajay's engagement party to warn them that Ajay and 'Vicky' look the same, to which Babulal, head servant of the Chopra household, answers. As Babulal tries to inform Priya about this, Ajay intercepts the phone call, arrives at Anjali's place, and kills her, stuffing her body in a suitcase and throwing it in a river.

History repeats itself with Chopra handing over the power of attorney to 'Vicky' when he has to go on a business trip. However, a man and his dog find Anjali's body soon after on a beach, and when Priya and Inspector Karan hear about this, they realize that the murderer is still alive. Ajay decides to hasten his plans on realizing that Priya and Karan are hellbent on finding the killer, and that he has fallen in love with Priya. His plans hit a glitch when he and Priya run into the real Vicky Malhotra, Ajay's friend, whose identity he had taken, which makes Priya suspicious. After Chopra returns from his business trip, he is shocked to find that the company is run by the Sharma group. Ajay reveals the truth of his desire to seek revenge and kicks Chopra out.

Priya learns of Ajay's true identity from his friend, Vicky and rushes to Ajay's home in Panvel. She is shocked to see a marriage locket with photos of him with her sister. Ajay comes home, where she confronts him with his misdeeds. He then tells her his story and also tells her that due to the poverty her father forced his family into, his father died of a heart attack, and his younger sister died of illness. His mother went into a state of shock as a result of the loss of her husband and daughter, and in her mental instability, she is unable to recognize Ajay as her son. Priya realizes that it is her father who is at fault as Ajay introduces her to his mother. Chopra arrives at his home, shoots Ajay in the arm, and has his goons beat him up.

Soon his mother comes back to her senses, and when trying to intervene, Chopra injures her, angering Ajay. He fights the goons viciously and chases Chopra to the top of a wall at some ruins. He is about to kill Chopra when he is persuaded by police inspector Karan to have mercy for his mother's sake. Chopra takes the opportunity to impale him with a rod and laughs maniacally. Ajay laughs back and hugs Chopra, impaling him fatally with the same rod, and they both fall off the wall. He tells his mother that he has regained everything and collapses in her arms. Priya, Inspector Karan, and his mother watch despondently as Ajay succumbs to his injuries, finally at peace.

Cast
Shah Rukh Khan as Ajay Sharma (Vicky Malhotra)
Sumeet Pathak as Young Ajay
Kajol as Priya Chopra
Shilpa Shetty as Seema Chopra
Raakhee as Shobha Sharma
Dalip Tahil as Madan Chopra
Siddharth Ray as Inspector Karan Saxena
Johnny Lever as Babulal
Anant Mahadevan as Vishwanath Sharma
Prithvi Zutshi as Suresh Desai
Resham Tipnis as Anjali Sinha
Daboo Malik as Ravi Shukla
Dinesh Hingoo as Seth Bajodia
Manmauji as Taalia
Sharad Sankla as Charlie
Raju Srivastav as Charlie's friend
Harpal Singh as Cook Motu
Amrut Patel as Seema's driver
Anu Malik as himself the musician and host at the engagement. (special appearance)
Vinod Rathod as himself the singer at the engagement. (special appearance)

Production
The film's premise is a subversion of a concept loosely inspired by a Hollywood film, A Kiss Before Dying (1991), which itself was based on a novel of the same name. While it borrows the basic premise, Baazigar tells a different, subversive story. While Matt Dillon's character in A Kiss Before Dying is a villain who murders for money, Baazigar subverts this, with Shahrukh Khan's character instead being a sympathetic anti-hero seeking vengeance for the brutal injustices done to his family.

Several A-list Bollywood stars were approached for the lead role, but they turned it down, due to the character being a murderous, negative anti-hero. Anil Kapoor was the first choice to play the leading role. He however turned it down due to unavailability for the dates assigned. Salman Khan was then approached, but he was removed, with his father Salim Khan saying Salman was not ready for such a gamble. Akshay Kumar was the next choice, but he too rejected the offer, as it went against his "heroic" on-screen image. Shahrukh eventually convinced producer Ratan Jain and Ganesh Jain that only he could pull off the role; Jain liked his confidence, and cast him in the role. However, his casting was criticized by trade pundits who incorrectly predicted that "a boy with cute dimples" would never be accepted as an anti-hero. Initially, Sridevi was supposed to play both the female roles (as twin sisters) as did Sean Young in the original film, but the director later realized that due to of her massive popularity, the audience would not sympathize with the hero, if he killed the character played by Sridevi, hence they decided to cast two different actresses.

Music
The music was composed by Anu Malik and won him the Filmfare Award for Best Music Director. The song "Yeh Kaali Kaali Aankhein" earned singer Kumar Sanu his fourth consecutive Filmfare Award for Best Male Playback Singer after Aashiqui, Saajan and Deewana. Other singers featured in the album are Asha Bhosle, Pankaj Udhas, Alka Yagnik, Vinod Rathod and Sonali Vajpai. Lyrics by Gauhar Kanpuri, Rani Mallik, Zafar Gorakhpuri, Zameer Kazmi, Nawab Arzoo & Dev Kohli. The soundtrack was released by Venus Music. Dr. Alban's song "It's My Life" was also featured.

A soundtrack was also released in Marathi. The film's soundtrack album sold 10million units, making it the best-selling Bollywood soundtrack album of 1993. The soundtrack "Yeh Kaali Kaali Aankhein" samples the African hit "Yeke Yeke" and others.

Track listing

Box office
Baazigar was a commercial success and the fourth highest-grossing Indian film of 1993, behind another Shah Rukh Khan-starrer, Darr. Baazigars collections in India were  net and  gross, equivalent to  adjusted for inflation.

Accolades

Influence
The later American films Almost Famous (2000) and Baywatch (2017) had strikingly similar posters to Baazigar. The posters of the two films feature Kate Hudson and Priyanka Chopra, respectively, wearing sunglasses that reflect other cast members, similar to the sunglasses Shah Rukh Khan wears on the poster for Baazigar.

References

External links 

 

1990s Hindi-language films
1990s romantic thriller films
1993 crime thriller films
1993 films
Films about identity theft
Films based on American novels
Films based on thriller novels
Films based on works by Ira Levin
Films directed by Abbas–Mustan
Films scored by Anu Malik
Films set in Mumbai
Films shot in Mumbai
Films with screenplays by Akash Khurana
Films with screenplays by Robin Bhatt
Hindi films remade in other languages
Indian crime thriller films
Indian films about revenge
Indian remakes of American films
Indian romantic thriller films
Romantic crime films